Harry Edmund Roberts (5 June 1924 – 3 October 1995) was an English cricketer active in the late 1940s and early 1950s, playing in five first-class cricket matches.

Born at Earlsdon in Coventry, Warwickshire, Roberts was educated locally in Coventry. A left-handed opening batsman, he played for several top local league sides, including Coventry and North Warwickshire. He made his debut in first-class cricket when he was selected to play for Warwickshire against Cambridge University at Fenner's in 1949. He made four further appearances in first-class cricket for Warwickshire to 1950, with his final appearance coming against Oxford University at University Parks, Oxford. He scored a total of 52 runs in his five matches, averaging 6.50, with a high score of 30 which he made on debut.

He died at Coventry on 3 October 1995, when he committed suicide by jumping in front of a train.

References

External links
Harry Roberts at ESPNcricinfo
Harry Roberts at CricketArchive

`

1924 births
1995 suicides
Cricketers from Coventry
English cricketers
Warwickshire cricketers
Suicides in England
Suicides by train